Arthur Graham (born 26 October 1952) is a Scottish former professional footballer who played as a left winger for Aberdeen, Leeds United, Manchester United, Bradford City and the Scotland national team.

Club career
Graham was raised in the Castlemilk district of Glasgow. One of 11 siblings, he attended St Margaret Mary's Secondary School and supported Celtic as a child. Ray Houghton, who would also become an international footballer, was a downstairs neighbour in the same tenement block.

After a short spell in the Junior grade with Cambuslang Rangers (which had quickly escalated from a casual kickaround with workmates at the nearby steel works), in early 1970 he was signed by Aberdeen whose scout Bobby Calder offered generous terms to persuade him to move north with Celtic also showing interest. He played in five league matches during his first season with the club, and despite his inexperience, he was given a place in the starting line-up for the 1970 Scottish Cup Final by manager Eddie Turnbull. Aberdeen defeated Celtic 3–1 with 17-year-old Graham making two assists via left-wing crosses. He remained at Aberdeen until July 1977, winning the Scottish League Cup in his final season (again beating Celtic in the final). He played a total of 298 matches for The Dons, scoring 45 goals.

He joined Leeds United for £125,000 at the start of the 1977–78 season. He scored a total of 47 goals in 260 appearances for Leeds over six seasons, including a hat-trick against Birmingham City on 14 January 1978 - the first hat-trick to be scored by a Leeds United player in any competition for nearly five years.

However, Leeds were relegated to the Second Division in the 1981–82 season and failed to regain their status in the top flight in 1982–83. Graham was subsequently sold to Manchester United for £45,000 in August 1983.

He remained at Old Trafford for two seasons, scoring seven goals in 52 appearances in all competitions, before finishing his career at Bradford City where he remained until 1987.

International career
Having been capped at under-23 level at Aberdeen, Graham's international career seemed to be over prematurely when he was one of a group of squad players (including Billy Bremner and Joe Harper) 'banned for life' after an incident in Copenhagen in 1975. He was later reprieved, and won a total of 11 full international caps for Scotland while playing for Leeds, making his debut against East Germany in 1977. He scored twice at international level, against Argentina and Northern Ireland – both in 1979.

Post-playing activities
Graham has spent time coaching youngsters at the Leeds United Academy and at football schools in the Wetherby area where he settled - often working with Jimmy Lumsden.

His younger brothers Jimmy and Tommy were also footballers.

In popular culture
Graham is frequently mentioned in the letters page of the comic Viz. In every edition, there will be a recommendation from a 'reader' that Graham is the only man to be considered for a range of positions. Graham has been recommended for a host of unlikely positions, such as taking over from Jeremy Clarkson as host of Top Gear, mediating peace negotiations between Russia and Ukraine, taking the editor's position at the London Evening Standard ahead of George Osborne, and presenting The Great British Bake Off.

Career statistics

Club

International 

Scores and results list Scotland's goal tally first, score column indicates score after each Graham goal

Honours
Aberdeen
Scottish Cup: 1969–70
Scottish League Cup: 1976–77

Manchester United
FA Charity Shield: 1983

References

External links
Profile at leeds-fans.org
Profile at sportingheroes.net

Hall Of Fame profile at AFC Heritage Trust

1952 births
Living people
Scottish footballers
Scotland international footballers
Aberdeen F.C. players
Leeds United F.C. players
Manchester United F.C. players
Cambuslang Rangers F.C. players
Bradford City A.F.C. players
English Football League players
Footballers from Glasgow
Scottish Football League players
Association football wingers
Scotland under-23 international footballers
Bradford City A.F.C. non-playing staff
Leeds United F.C. non-playing staff
Sheet metal workers